Canopener or can opener, may refer to:

In general
 Can opener (tin opener), a mechanical device used to open tin cans
 Can opener (hold) (spinal lock), a grappling hold
 Can opener (tennis), a type of serve
 Can opener capsulotomy, a medical procedure
 Can opener, a variant of cannonball (diving)

Transportation
 , nicknamed "Can Opener"; a U.S. Navy aircraft carrier
 Supersonic Can Opener, a paint scheme used by the VF-51
 Conrail Can Opener, a paint scheme used on the GE C32-8
 Canopener Bridge, the Norfolk Southern–Gregson Street Overpass; a railroad bridge in Durham, North Carolina, USA

Entertainment
 Can Opener, a science fiction story by Vasili Golovachov
 "Can Opener", 2016 season 1 episode 7 of MacGyver; see MacGyver (2016 TV series, season 1)
 "The Can Opener", 1999 season 4 episode 2 number 75 of Everybody Loves Raymond; see Everybody Loves Raymond (season 4)
 "Can Opener", a 2009 song by Wallis Bird from the album New Boots
 "Can Opener", a 1992 song by Quicksand from the album Slip (album)
 "The Can Opener", a 1986 track by Robyn Hitchcock and the Egyptians from the album Element of Light
 "Canopener", a 1983 song by the Tall Dwarfs from the EP Canned Music

Other uses
 Can Opener Lake, Ontario, Canada; see List of lakes of Ontario: C
 Can-opener smoothdream, a species of anglerfish

See also

 Assume a can opener, a criticism of oversimplification in hypothesis formulation
 
 
 
 
 
 

 Opener (disambiguation)
 Can (disambiguation)
 Tin (disambiguation)
 tin can